Sergei Leonidovich Skoblyakov (born 2 January 1977) is a former Russian footballer.

He spent his playing career at FC Tom Tomsk for about 10 years.

His brother Dmitri Skoblyakov was also a professional footballer.

External links
  Player page on the official FC Tom Tomsk website
 

1977 births
Living people
Russian footballers
Russian expatriate footballers
Expatriate footballers in Latvia
FC Tyumen players
FK Liepājas Metalurgs players
FC Tom Tomsk players
FC Khimki players
Russian Premier League players
Russian expatriate sportspeople in Latvia
Association football midfielders
FC FShM Torpedo Moscow players
FC Spartak-2 Moscow players